Boris Jovanović (born 23 July 1972) is a Serbian former professional footballer who played as a goalkeeper. He spent the majority of his footballing career in Germany.

References

External links
 
 
 

1. FC Lokomotive Leipzig players
2. Bundesliga players
Association football goalkeepers
Borussia Fulda players
Dynamo Dresden players
Expatriate footballers in Germany
FC Carl Zeiss Jena players
FC Sachsen Leipzig players
Regionalliga players
Serbia and Montenegro expatriate footballers
Serbia and Montenegro expatriates in Germany
Serbia and Montenegro footballers
Serbian expatriate footballers
Serbian expatriate sportspeople in Germany
Serbian footballers
SpVgg Unterhaching players
SSV Reutlingen 05 players
VfB Pößneck players
1972 births
Living people